Ankyrin-3 (ANK-3), also known as  ankyrin-G, is a protein from ankyrin family that in humans is encoded by the ANK3 gene.

Function 

The protein encoded by this gene, ankyrin-3 is an immunologically distinct gene product from ankyrins ANK1 and ANK2, and was originally found at the axonal initial segment and nodes of Ranvier of neurons in the central and peripheral nervous systems. Alternatively spliced variants may be expressed in other tissues. Although multiple transcript variants encoding several different isoforms have been found for this gene, the full-length nature of only two have been characterized.

Within the nervous system, ankyrin-G is specifically localized to the neuromuscular junction, the axon initial segment and the Nodes of Ranvier. Within the nodes of Ranvier where action potentials are actively propagated, ankyrin-G has long been thought to be the intermediate binding partner to neurofascin and voltage-gated sodium channels. The genetic deletion of ankyrin-G from multiple neuron types has shown that ankyrin-G is required for the normal clustering of voltage-gated sodium channels at the axon hillock and for action potential firing.

Disease linkage 

The  ANK3 protein associates with the cardiac sodium channel Nav1.5. Both proteins are highly expressed at ventricular intercalated disc and T-tubule membranes in cardiomyocytes. A mutation in the Nav1.5 protein blocks interaction with ANK3 binding and therefore disrupts surface expression of Nav1.5 in cardiomyocytes resulting in Brugada syndrome, a type of cardiac arrhythmia.

Other mutations in the ANK3 gene may be involved in the bipolar disorder and intellectual disability.

Ankyrin family 

The protein encoded by the ANK3 gene is a member of the ankyrin  family of proteins that link the integral membrane proteins to the underlying spectrin-actin cytoskeleton. Ankyrins play key roles in activities such as cell motility, activation, proliferation, contact and the maintenance of specialized membrane domains. Most ankyrins are typically composed of three structural domains: an amino-terminal domain containing multiple ankyrin repeats; a central region with a highly conserved spectrin binding domain; and a carboxy-terminal regulatory domain which is the least conserved and subject to variation.

References

Further reading

External links 
 
 

Biology of bipolar disorder